Megan Coyne (born ) is an American Democratic political communications specialist. She currently serves as the White House Deputy Director of Platforms, where she manages the Twitter account for the White House. She has previously run social media platforms in New Jersey, including the official New Jersey state twitter account and the social media account of New Jersey governor Phil Murphy.

Coyne is a native of Livingston, New Jersey, and is a graduate of Rutgers University class of 2019.

Early life and education 
Born and raised in New Jersey, Coyne is a native of Livingston, New Jersey, and is a graduate of Livingston High School. After her graduation from high school, she enrolled at Rutgers University. She became active in the Rutgers chapter of College Democrats and was elected president of the College Democrats of New Jersey in 2018, becoming the state group's first female president. She graduated from Rutgers with her bachelor's degree in political science in 2019.

Career

New Jersey 
In 2017, Coyne began her involvement in statewide New Jersey politics as an intern for the 2017 gubernatorial campaign of Phil Murphy, who would later become the Governor of New Jersey. Throughout much of 2018 and 2019, Coyne worked in Murphy's administration as a communications intern, before becoming a full-time member of the governor's communications staff in 2019 following her graduation from Rutgers University.

As a full-time staff member in the Office of the Governor, Coyne was one of the two people to run the New Jersey state Twitter account, shaping the account's posting into a mix of internet memes and official information. Coyne became widely recognized among Democrats, owing to the account's viral tweets and its poignant persona. Under her tenure, the New Jersey state Twitter account grew substantially and became the largest official Twitter account of any U.S. state.

White House 
In August 2022, Coyne left her role in New Jersey to serve as the White House Deputy Director of Platforms, where she manages the Twitter account for the White House. Shortly thereafter, several U.S. representatives tweeted in opposition to Biden's student loan forgiveness program; the White House account responded by quote tweeting the representatives and noting how much each individual representative received in PPP loan forgiveness. One user remarked that the White House had gone "goblin mode"; as the account's new manager, Coyne was speculated to be behind the tweets. The White House has not confirmed that rumor, although Buzzfeed News reported that Coyne retweeted a screenshot of the trending incident with a ":)".

References 

1990s births
Livingston High School (New Jersey) alumni
Social media accounts
Women in New Jersey politics
People from Livingston, New Jersey
Rutgers University alumni
New Jersey Democrats
Living people
Year of birth missing (living people)